2008–09 Belarusian Cup was the eighteenth season of the Belarusian annual cup competition. Contrary to the league season, it was conducted in a fall-spring rhythm. The first games were played on 30 July 2008. Winners of the Cup qualified for the UEFA Europa League second qualifying round.

Preliminary round
A preliminary round was held in order to reduce the number of teams in the First Round to 32. The matches were played on 30 July 2008.

First round
All fourteen teams of the First League and most of Second League teams plus three more amateur teams started in this round. They were joined by three winners of Preliminary Round. The games were played on July 30, except two games with Preliminary Round winners, which were held on August 3 and August 6.

Round of 32
Sixteen winners of the First Round were paired against the sixteen teams of the Premier League. The games were played on 3, 4 and 7 September 2008.

Round of 16
The games were played as two-legged ties. The first legs were played on October 11, 12, 29 and November 4, 2008. The second legs were played on November 2 and 20, 2008.

|}

First leg

Second leg

Quarterfinals
The first legs were played on March 15, 2009. The second legs were played on March 21, 2009.

|}

First leg

Second leg

Semifinals
The first legs were played on 9 April 2009. The second legs were played on 22 April 2009.

|}

First leg

Second leg

Final

See also
 2008 Belarusian Premier League
 2009 Belarusian Premier League

External links
 Official website 
 soccerway.com

Belarusian Cup, 2008-09
Cup, 2008-09
Cup, 2008-09
Belarusian Cup seasons